The women's sprint competition of the cycling events at the 2011 Pan American Games will be held on October 18 at the Pan American Velodrome in Guadalajara. The defending champion is Diana Orrego of Colombia.

Schedule
All times are Central Standard Time (UTC−6).

Results

Qualification
The top eight riders qualify for the quarterfinals.

Quarterfinals

Semifinals

Finals

References

Track cycling at the 2011 Pan American Games
Women's sprint (track cycling)
Pan